Kazuyoshi (written: 和良, 和美, 和喜, 和佳, 和慶, 和義, 和嘉, 和幸, 知良, 一義, 一吉, 一良, 一慶, 一巖 or 一嘉) is a masculine Japanese given name. Notable people with the name include:

, Japanese politician
, Japanese conductor
, Japanese sumo wrestler
, Japanese ski jumper
, Japanese racing driver and businessman
, Japanese karateka
, Japanese triple jumper
, Japanese astronomer
, Japanese politician
, Japanese anime director
, Japanese sumo wrestler
, Japanese Buddhist scholar
, Japanese Yakuza member
, Japanese film director
, Japanese footballer
, Japanese footballer
, Japanese footballer
, Japanese businessman
, Japanese footballer
, Japanese politician
, Japanese photographer
, Japanese figure skater and coach
, Japanese singer-songwriter
, Japanese film director
, Japanese politician
, Japanese footballer
, Japanese baseball player
, Japanese anime director

Japanese masculine given names